Nina Bratchikova and Ekaterina Ivanova were the defending champions, but both chose not to participate. Valentyna Ivakhnenko and Kateryna Kozlova defeated Erika Sema and Roxane Vaisemberg in the final, 2–6, 7–5, [12–10].

Seeds

Draw

Draw

References
 Main Draw

Open 88 Contrexeville - Doubles